Yebes is a municipality located in the province of Guadalajara, Castilla–La Mancha, Spain. According to the 2004 census (INE), the municipality had a population of 235 inhabitants. 

The Yebes Observatory with its RT40m radio telescope is located in Yebes.

Ciudad Valdeluz
A new town called Ciudad Valdeluz is being developed within the boundaries of Yebes some 10 kilometres from the village.  The project was intended to take advantage of the new high-speed railway between Madrid and Barcelona, but it has been adversely affected by the Spanish property bubble.

The project to make the new town was approved in September 2002 by the provincial planning commission. The construction began in 2004 for a time estimated to complete in 7 years more and the first residents arrived in 2006. The developer Construcciones Reyal S.A. had invested more than 1.1 billion of Euros in the construction of the city before the economic bubble exploded.

See also
 Guadalajara–Yebes railway station

References

External links

Municipalities in the Province of Guadalajara